The Men's Downhill in the 2023 FIS Alpine Skiing World Cup is currently scheduled to consist of ten events, including the final. The season had been planned with fourteen downhills, but two scheduled downhills on 29/30 October 2022 on the Matterhorn, running from Switzerland into Italy (Zermatt to Cervinia), were canceled due to lack of snow and not rescheduled. Later in the season, a downhill scheduled for Garmisch-Partenkirchen on 28 January 2023 was also cancelled for lack of snow and not rescheduled. On 3 March, a scheduled downhill at Aspen was canceled due to poor visibility and deteriorating weather conditions, even though 24 racers had already started. The first out of the starting gate, Norway's Adrian Smiseth Sejersted, held the lead and was hoping for six more competitors to start so that the race would become official, but the weather conditions prevented that.

After eight events, defending champion Aleksander Aamodt Kilde of Norway had won five times, and held more than a 150-point lead over three-time winner Vincent Kriechmayr of Austria. The remaining downhills will take place in March 2023, by which time four-time former discipline champion Beat Feuz of Switzerland will have retired, joining longtime star Matthias Mayer of Austria with an in-season retirement, even though both were currently in the top 10 in the discipline.  After another cancelation, Kilde won the downhill in Aspen, thus clinching the season championship prior to the finals.

The season was interrupted by the 2023 World Ski Championships in the linked resorts of Courchevel and Méribel, France from 6–19 February 2023. Although the Alpine Skiing branch of the International Ski Federation (FIS) conducts both the World Cup and the World Championships, the World Championships are organized by nation (a maximum of four skiers is generally permitted per nation), and (since 1970) the results count only for World Championship medals, not for World Cup points. Accordingly, the results in the World Championship are highlighted in blue and shown in this table by ordinal position only in each discipline.  The men's downhill was held on 12 February at Courchevel on the L’Éclipse course.

The season final took place on 15 March at Soldeu, Andorra. Eligible to partake were the top 25 in the downhill standings, others who have at least 500 points in the overall standings, and the downhill gold medalist at the Junior World Championships. With the reduced field, only the top 15 earned points.

Standings

Legend

DNF = Did Not Finish 
DSQ = Disqualified

See also
 2023 Alpine Skiing World Cup – Men's summary rankings
 2023 Alpine Skiing World Cup – Men's Overall
 2023 Alpine Skiing World Cup – Men's Super-G
 2023 Alpine Skiing World Cup – Men's Giant Slalom
 2023 Alpine Skiing World Cup – Men's Slalom
 World Cup scoring system

References

External links
 Alpine Skiing at FIS website

External links
 

Men's downhill
FIS Alpine Ski World Cup men's downhill discipline titles